Party of Narodnik Communists was a political party in Russia. The party was formed by a section of Left Socialist-Revolutionaries, who wished to cooperate with the Bolsheviks. Znamya Trudovoi Kommuny was the central organ of the party.

The formation of the Party of Narodnik Communists, as well as the Party of Revolutionary Communism (another Left SR dissident group), took place after the provocative assassination of the German Ambassador Mirbach by the Left Socialist-Revolutionaries and the revolt of the Left Socialist-Revolutionaries on July 6–7, 1918. The Party of Narodnik Communists condemned the anti-Soviet activities of the Left Socialist-Revolutionaries and formed a party of their own at a conference in September 1918. In November 1918 the Congress of the Party of Narodnik Communists decided to dissolve and merge with the Russian Communist Party (bolsheviks).

References

1918 establishments in Russia
1918 disestablishments in Russia
Defunct communist parties in Russia
Narodniks
Political parties of the Russian Revolution
Political parties established in 1918
Political parties disestablished in 1920